Mukhed  Assembly constituency is one of the 288 Vidhan Sabha (legislative assembly) constituencies of Maharashtra state, western India. This constituency is located in Nanded district. The delimitation of the constituency happened in 2008.

Geographical scope
As per the 2008 delimitation there are nine assembly constituencies in Nanded district, viz. Kinwat, Hadgaon, Bhokar, Nanded North, Nanded South, Loha, Naigaon, Deglur and Mukhed. The constituency comprises Mukhed taluka and  Revenue circles
Pethwadaj and Kurla belonging to Kandhar taluka.

Representatives
 1962: Sabne Piraji Satwaji, Indian National Congress
 1978: Ghate Madhukarrao Rangojirao, Independent
 1980: Ravangaonkar Nagnathrao Satwajirao, INC(U)
 1985: Ghate Madhukarrao Rangojirao, Indian National Congress
 1990: Ghate Madhukarrao Rangoji, Indian National Congress
 1995: Avinash Madhukarrao Ghate, Indian National Congress
 1999: Subhash Piraji Sabne, Shiv Sena
 2004: Subhash Piraji Sabne, Shiv Sena 
 2009: Hanmant Venketrao Patil, Indian National Congress
 2014: Govind Mukkaji Rathod, Bharatiya Janata Party
 2015 (By-poll): Tushar Rathod, Bharatiya Janata Party
 2019: Tushar Rathod, Bharatiya Janata Party

References

Assembly constituencies of Maharashtra
Politics of Nanded district